Anton Mangman (10 January 1900 Väätsa Parish (now Türi Parish), Jerwen County – 4 November 1937 Soviet Union) was an Estonian politician. He was a member of II Riigikogu. He was a member of the Riigikogu since 29 February 1924. He replaced Aleksander Janson. On 3 April 1924, he resigned his position and he was replaced by Johannes Jürna.

References

1900 births
1937 deaths
People from Türi Parish
People from Kreis Jerwen
Workers' United Front politicians
Members of the Riigikogu, 1923–1926
Estonian emigrants to the Soviet Union
Great Purge victims from Estonia